Pro Musica Antiqua (Latin, "for ancient music") may refer to:

The Pro Musica Antiqua song by jazz performer Blossom Dearie from her LB My New Celebrity Is You
Pro Musica Antiqua of Brussels, 1930s ensemble of Safford Cape
New York Pro Musica, founded (1952) as Pro Musica Antiqua, ensemble specializing in Medieval and Renaissance music
Pro Musica Antiqua (Polish ensemble), 1992

See also
Pro Cantione Antiqua, English early music group